University of Agricultural Sciences and Veterinary Medicine or University of Agronomic Sciences and Veterinary Medicine (Universitatea de Ştiinţe Agricole şi Medicină Veterinară or Universitatea de Ştiinţe Agronomice şi Medicină Veterinară; abbreviated USAMV) may refer to four educational institutions in Romania:

University of Agronomic Sciences and Veterinary Medicine of Bucharest (Bucharest)
University of Agricultural Sciences and Veterinary Medicine of Cluj-Napoca (Cluj-Napoca)
Ion Ionescu de la Brad University of Agricultural Sciences and Veterinary Medicine of Iaşi (Iaşi)
Banat University of Agricultural Sciences and Veterinary Medicine (Timişoara)